Your Mom Men's Derby (YMMD) is a roller derby league based in Des Moines.  It consists of a single team, which plays against teams from other leagues.

Your Mom joined the Men's Roller Derby Association (MRDA) in June 2011, and narrowly missed out on qualifying for that year's MRDA Championships.

The team played at the Spring Roll tournament early in 2012, where it surprisingly beat the top-ranked team, New York Shock Exchange.  As a result, Your Mom were ranked number one for the 2012 MRDA Championships, and won the tournament, beating the St. Louis GateKeepers by a single point in the final.  In honor of the win, the Mayor of Des Moines declared December 8 to be "Your Mom Men's Roller Derby Day".  In celebration, the team played a bout against all-star team of women skaters from the Mid West, calling themselves "That's What She Said".

References

Men's roller derby
Roller derby leagues established in 2010
Roller derby leagues in Iowa
Sports in Des Moines, Iowa
2010 establishments in Iowa